Castle of the Pomeranian Dukes - the only Gothic castle located on the coast of the Baltic Sea in Poland. The castle's layout is close to that of a square, with a tower measuring 24 metres in height. The castle's construction began in 1352, in the reign of Bogusław V, whose reign began the alliance with the Hanseatic League. In the eighteenth and nineteenth centuries the castle was used as a warehouse and a prison. In 1930, the castle was turned into a museum.

History

The Castle of the Pomeranian Dukes was built during the second half of the fourteenth century, in 1352. It was constructed during the reign of Bogusław V and Elżbieta, the daughter of Casimir III the Great. Although this was only a secondary residence of the House of Pomerania, the castle was enlarged and modernised in the fifteenth and sixteenth century, becoming a worthy royal residence. The town of Darłowo was given the title of The Royal City of Darłowo (Królewskie Miasto Darłowo, Polish)

The greatest expansion of the castle was done under the reign of Eric of Pomerania, who rebuilt the castle to that of the design of his previous residence, Kronborg Castle. He also modernised the castle's defensive fortifications, and built a second defence line, in the form of dikes around the castle. The following expansion of the castle was done under the reign of Duke Bogusław X, when a new wing was built. The next changes were done by Duke Barnim XI. After a great fire, which devastated the castle in 1624, the last Duke of the House of Pomerania, Bogusław XIV, rebuilt the castle. However, he did not restore the castle to its original architectural style. The castle lost many of its defences, and a chapel was built inside the Duke Hall. After the duke's death, his widow, Duchess Elżbieta, took over the castle, and lived there until her death.

See also
Castles in Poland

References

Buildings and structures completed in 1352
14th-century fortifications
15th-century fortifications
Castles in West Pomeranian Voivodeship
Sławno County